Christian Traverso (born August 19, 1971 in Buenos Aires, Argentina) is a former Argentine footballer who played for clubs of Argentina and Chile.

Teams
  Deportivo Riestra 1990
  Defensores de Belgrano 1991-1994
  Barracas Central 1995-1996
  Deportes Antofagasta 1997-2003
  Deportes Melipilla 2004-2006
  San Luis Quillota 2007-2008
  Sacachispas 2009

Titles
  Deportes Melipilla 2004 and 2006 Primera B

References
 Profile at BDFA 

1971 births
Living people
Argentine footballers
Argentine expatriate footballers
Defensores de Belgrano footballers
C.D. Antofagasta footballers
Deportes Melipilla footballers
San Luis de Quillota footballers
Expatriate footballers in Chile
Association footballers not categorized by position
Footballers from Buenos Aires